Langer Berg is a former Verwaltungsgemeinschaft ("collective municipality") in the district Ilm-Kreis, in Thuringia, Germany. The seat of the Verwaltungsgemeinschaft was in Gehren. It was disbanded in July 2018.

The Verwaltungsgemeinschaft Langer Berg consisted of the following municipalities:

Gehren
Herschdorf 
Neustadt am Rennsteig 
Pennewitz

Former Verwaltungsgemeinschaften in Thuringia